Juris Upītis (born June 16, 1991) is a Latvian ice hockey player. He was also a part of Latvian national junior team.

On October 30, 2011, due to injury of Jamie Lundmark Upītis was called to Dinamo Riga of the Kontinental Hockey League. On his debut against Metallurg Magnitogorsk he scored his first KHL goal, a second period equalizer, the regulation ended at 1-1. Dinamo won the game in shootout.

After spells with HK Kurbads in Latvia and MHC Martin in Slovakia, Upitis moved to the UK to sign for the Edinburgh Capitals in August 2017.

Career statistics

Regular season and playoffs

References

External links

1991 births
Dinamo Riga players
Edinburgh Capitals players
Expatriate ice hockey players in Russia
HK Liepājas Metalurgs players
MHC Martin players
HK Riga players
Prizma Riga players
Yermak Angarsk players
Sokol Krasnoyarsk players
Latvian ice hockey left wingers
Living people
Ice hockey people from Riga
Latvian expatriate sportspeople in Scotland
Expatriate ice hockey players in Scotland
Latvian expatriate sportspeople in France
Expatriate ice hockey players in France
Latvian expatriate sportspeople in Germany
Expatriate ice hockey players in Germany
Latvian expatriate sportspeople in Russia
Latvian expatriate sportspeople in Slovakia
Expatriate ice hockey players in Slovakia
Latvian expatriate sportspeople in Kazakhstan
Expatriate ice hockey players in Kazakhstan
Latvian expatriate ice hockey people